Howling II: Your Sister Is a Werewolf (also known as Howling II and Howling II: Stirba – Werewolf Bitch) is a 1985 American horror film directed by Philippe Mora and direct sequel to the 1981 film The Howling. The film stars horror film veteran Christopher Lee along with Reb Brown and Annie McEnroe as they try to defeat Sybil Danning's werewolf queen Stirba and stop a werewolf group's plans to conquer the world. Although Gary Brandner, author of The Howling novels, co-wrote the screenplay, the Howling II: Your Sister Is a Werewolf is largely unrelated to his 1979 novel The Howling II.

Plot
Ben White (Reb Brown) attends the funeral of his sister, journalist Karen White, the heroine of the previous film. Following her interment in a mausoleum, Ben meets both Jenny Templeton (Annie McEnroe), one of Karen's colleagues, and Stefan Crosscoe (Christopher Lee), a mysterious interloper who tells him Karen was a werewolf. Providing videotaped evidence of the transformation – and turning up to destroy Karen as her undead body rises from the grave – Crosscoe convinces Ben and Jenny to accompany him to Transylvania to battle Stirba (Sybil Danning), an immortal werewolf queen. Along the way, the trio encounter Mariana (Marsha Hunt), another lusty werewolf siren, and her minion, Erle (Ferdy Mayne).

Arriving in the Balkans, Ben and company wander through an ethnic folk festival, unaware that Stirba is off in her nearby castle already plotting their downfall. Stefan introduces Ben and Jenny to several locals who are sworn to oppose Stirba due to the deaths of their various family members, all of whom were killed either by Stirba or her followers. One night, Ben and Vasile find Stirba's castle nearby but are forced to flee after being spotted and Vasile is killed in the escape. Stirba later uses Vasile's reanimated corpse to lure Stefan into a trap but is saved by Ben at the last minute. During this, Jenny is captured and taken to Stirba's castle. 

Ben, Stefan, Konstantin, Luca and Father Florin assault the castle but are ambushed Stirba's werewolves; Konstantin and Luca are killed in the battle and Father Florin is injured. Arriving at the castle, the three split up to locate Jenny and kill Stirba. Ben rescues Jenny, killing Mariana in the process, and flees the castle while Stefan and Father Florin confront Stirba. Florin is killed by Stirba's demon but Stefan manages to kill Stirba, who burns to death with her. 

Sometime later, Ben and Jenny have returned to the United States and are living as a couple. A trick-or-treater knocks on their door and they are confronted by what appears to be a child in a werewolf costume. After the child goes into the apartment next door, they knock on the door and are met by a Romanian man who claims that he does not have any children and lives alone. Declining his offer to come in for a drink, Ben and Jenny return to their apartment.

Cast
 Christopher Lee as Stefan Crosscoe
 Annie McEnroe as Jenny Templeton
 Reb Brown as Ben White
 Marsha Hunt as Mariana
 Sybil Danning as Stirba
 Valerie Kaplanová as old Stirba
 Judd Omen as Vlad
 Jiří Krytinář as Vasile 
 Petr Skarke as Konstantin 
 Ferdy Mayne as Erle
 Jimmy Nail as Dom
 Patrick Field as Deacon
 Ladislav Krečmer as Father Florin
 Ivo Niederle as Grigorie 
 Jan Kraus as Tondo

Production 
This film is the only Howling sequel that directly follows the original film's events, and is also the only Howling film to feature the input of the original novelist, Gary Brandner. Brandner was critical of the original 1981 film, which was only a loose adaptation of his 1977 novel, and some elements of this sequel may have been deliberately divergent from the previous film, though some (such as this film's retconning of the worldwide revelation of the existence of werewolves) seem to be accidental.

The film features a sequence in which new wave band Babel play their song "The Howling". Babel were: Stephen W. Parsons (lead singer); Chris Pye (guitar); Simon Etchell (keyboard); Steve Young (drums). Three of these musicians later played in another band, State Project. Parsons composed the soundtrack of the film.

Director Philippe Mora related how the film was set to celebrate the 10,000th birthday of bi-curious werewolf queen Stirba and was inspired by New Wave eroticism. He revealed that actors Reb Brown and Annie McEnroe were so bad in their roles that veteran Christopher Lee acted off-set in a manner as if "wishing himself away". Also revealed was that the scene with Sybil Danning revealing her bare breasts was repeated 17 times during the end credits screen crawl. For most other scenes in the movie, Danning was either covered with hair or wearing a metallic armoured outfit and sunglasses.

While most of the film was shot on locations in what was, at the time, the country of Czechoslovakia–for example, in the ossuary in Mělník, a town in Central Bohemia, as well as at Barrandov Studios, Prague–some scenes were shot in Los Angeles.

Shooting in communist Prague offered difficulties: Mora's government-assigned assistant director knew nothing of filmmaking. Mora had to "literally import trash from America to clutter the clean communist streets". When a local casting call went out looking for "punks", 1,000 individuals arrived, resulting in the local authorities calling in both the police and military. Mora was advised by an army colonel, "you can finish shooting the scene, but they'll have to leave in groups of no more than three".

Co-stars Marsha Hunt and Christopher Lee previously together appeared in Dracula A.D. 1972. In 1990, when Lee was cast in Gremlins 2: The New Batch, one of the first things he did was apologize to director Joe Dante (who directed The Howling) for being in this film. Lee had also played the antagonist in Captain America II: Death Too Soon (1979), which starred Reb Brown in the title role.

Release

Hemdale Films had an original theatrical release in France and England in 1985, before its theatrical release in the United States in December 1985. Among its international release titles, it is known as Aullidos 2: Stirba, la mujer lobo or Aullidos 2 in Spain, Aullido 2 in Mexico, Üvöltés 2 - A nővéred egy vérfarkas in Hungary, Howling II - L'ululato in Italy, Hurlements II in France, Das Tier II in Germany, I gynaika lykanthropos (Greek script: Η γυναίκα λυκάνθρωπος) in Greece, and Vampiros em Fúria in Portugal. In its later U.S. release, the film was marketed with the tagline "The rocking, shocking new wave of horror!"

Alternative versions
The original theatrical release version of Howling II: Stirba - Werewolf Bitch ran at 87 minutes. This version was released on VHS from HBO / Cannon Home Video and Home Video. The re-edited TV version ran at 91 minutes, and included a new scene before the end credits, plus a brand-new end credits sequence in order to replace the topless shots of Sybil Danning in the original's R-rated end sequence. The TV end credits also include music, whereas the theatrical version is silent.

The film failed to garner as much attention or commercial success as the original film. In later years, Howling II acquired a cult following, perhaps due to the presence of cult actors Sybil Danning, Reb Brown and Christopher Lee.

Critical response
Roger Ebert spoke toward Sybil Danning's work in the film and wrote that although it was close, it was "not the worst movie Danning has made". In noting the film's heroes becoming involved in the inept and "strange rituals of the cult of Stirba", he concedes that "no one presides over a ritual quite as well as Sybil Danning".  The scene where she rips open her dress is repeated twice during the closing credits, "providing the movie with its second and third interesting moments".

Variety offered that, while Christopher Lee brought experience to his role as vampire hunter Stefan Crosscoe, the film lacks suspense and the plot is generic and predictable. They noted that, despite the film being shot primarily in Czechoslovakia, production did not take full advantage of the setting. Bob Campbell of the Arizona Daily Star wrote: "A bad sequel to a B-movie shocker doesn't really count as an artistic betrayal, but Howling II is about as bad as movies ever get".

Brian J. Dillard of Allrovi called it a "laughable exercise in horror-sequel tomfoolery", which "strays into so-bad-it's-good camp appeal". He noted that the sex appeal of Sybil Danning and the work of veteran horror stars Christopher Lee and Ferdy Mayne were used as substitutes for "the wit and inventive effects work that characterized the original". In noting the script's overuse of horror genre clichés, he was able to praise Danning's work for its keeping the film from being too serious. He concluded by writing "later Howling sequels would drift into a more polished form of banality, but for utter what-were-they-thinking ineptitude, it's hard to beat this wretched howler".

Home video
MGM Home Entertainment had a commercial re-release of the DVD for Your Sister Is a Werewolf in 2005, and released it again in 2010 as part of a two-disc set which included both 1985's Your Sister Is a Werewolf and 1981's The Howling.

Howling II was released on Blu-ray by Scream Factory on July 14, 2015.

References

External links
 
 
 

1985 films
1985 horror films
1980s supernatural horror films
American supernatural horror films
American independent films
1980s English-language films
Films based on American horror novels
Films shot in the Czech Republic
The Howling films
American werewolf films
Films directed by Philippe Mora
1985 independent films
Films set in Transylvania
1980s American films